There are several places named Burrell in Pennsylvania:

Burrell Township, Armstrong County, Pennsylvania
Burrell Township, Indiana County, Pennsylvania
Burrell Township, Pennsylvania (disambiguation)
Lower Burrell, Pennsylvania
Upper Burrell Township, Pennsylvania